Villagers are playable characters in the Animal Crossing series. Villagers first appeared in Animal Crossing.  Villagers also appear in Mario Kart 8, Super Smash Bros. for Nintendo 3DS and Wii U and Super Smash Bros. Ultimate as playable characters.

Characteristics and concept
In Animal Crossing, Villager or Player Avatar is a term used for the controllable avatar in the Animal Crossing series. The player may be either male or female; the differences in all games are largely cosmetic, with slight variations to some dialogue whenever the conversation becomes gender specific. The player uses a human Villager to build up a small town (an island in Animal Crossing: New Horizons) community of the NPC's talking animals. There are a number of different ways the player can interact with the town and other characters in the game. These may involve a variety of different hobbies in the game, such as fishing, bug catching, fashion and many more. Villagers do not necessarily have an active role in altering the town or the player but can be interacted with to develop friendships and to trade for furniture and tips. They also wear clothes and makeup, giving them a human appearance. They are capable of acting out different perceived, human emotions from crying to rejoicing, which are considered impossible in most animal species. The playable character can learn these emotions from the villagers themselves when they approach them. When its Summer and Winter, A Player avatar can be sent out to random NPC villager in the town, where they live inside a tent or an igloo for the day to be offered to play games, craft, and can be able to do the trade. In Animal Crossing: New Leaf, the player's villager takes on the role of the Town Mayor, a role which was filled by Mayor Tortimer in previous installments. What the player does is essentially the same as in previous games, but now with more customizable options. Being the Mayor involves two key areas; Public Works Projects and the Town Ordinance. In Animal Crossing: New Horizons, the player's villager is given more creative control over their character than before. Like in Animal Crossing: Happy Home Designer, they can choose their player's skin color, hairstyle, and face.

In Super Smash Bros., Villager's gameplay is mostly about being a camper. Their moves include the ability to catch other characters in a net and firing Lloid the gyroid as a missile. They can be able to swipe incoming projectiles as their pocket as neutral, deploy a balloon when recovering, and can also plant trees then chopping off for it to fall near the enemies, then eventually causing damages. During the interview of Famitsu, Masahiro Sakurai stated that the Villager had been excluded from Super Smash Bros. Brawl as Sakurai felt that Villager wouldn't be suitable for a fighting game's roster. When Isabelle appeared in Super Smash Bros. Ultimate based on fellow Animal Crossing character Villager, Super Smash Bros. series director Masahiro Sakurai chose not to make Isabelle an "Echo Fighter" (a character with relatively minor differences from another) of Villager because of her different animations and her proportions being based on character models in Animal Crossing: New Leaf, as opposed to earlier Animal Crossing character models.

Appearances
Villager originally appeared in Animal Crossing and later appeared in the Animal Crossing: Wild World, Animal Crossing: City Folk, Animal Crossing: New Leaf, Animal Crossing Plaza, Animal Crossing: Happy Home Designer, Animal Crossing: Amiibo Festival, Animal Crossing: Pocket Camp and Animal Crossing: New Horizons games.

Outside of the series, Villager and Isabelle are playable characters in Mario Kart 8 via downloadable content, along with a racetrack based on Animal Crossing and a cup named after the series known as the "Crossing Cup". Villager was also a playable character in Nintendo's 2014 fighting game Super Smash Bros. for Nintendo 3DS and Wii U, and 2018's Super Smash Bros. Ultimate.

Reception
According to USGamer, Villager is one of the more innocent-looking characters in Super Smash Bros. Ultimate, and initially receiving positive attention from people on the Internet upon their reveal on Super Smash Bros. for Nintendo 3DS and Wii U. Patricia Hernandez of Kotaku described the villager as a "giant troll", due to their moveset as they can pocket projectiles, and later calling it as "absurb". It was also cited by Cecilia D'Anastasio of Kotaku as the fifteenth most annoying character in the game, while Patricia Hernandez of Kotaku has claimed that the Villager and Wii Fit Trainer were her favorite characters in Nintendo 3DS and Wii U, citing their uniqueness and charm as factors. Patrick Hancock of Destructoid also praised the addition of Villager, and stated that "Villager's ability to catch and throw ANY projectile seems incredibly useful. He can also pull weeds which…I have no idea how it works, really. But I do know that I LOVE IT!". The Badger Herald calls the addition of Villager on the roster as "Hilarious", and citing the male's appearance "being immediately become beloved by fans with his happy stare and delightful smile quickly garnered him the reputation of being an unredeemable, murderous psychopath." Jeremy Parish of Polygon ranked 73 fighters from Super Smash Bros. Ultimate "from garbage to glorious", placing Villager at 46th place and stated that "They’re way out of their depth here, which leads us to believe they were probably forced into Smash’s deadly combat arena by that conniving late-capitalist creep Tom Nook." Gavin Jasper of Den of Geek ranked Villager as 68th on his list of Super Smash Bros. Ultimate characters, stating that "That creepy, vacant smile… I don’t want to talk about Villager right now. Or ever. He'll know. He'll hear me. Somehow, he'll hear me and I'll be next." According to John Adams of his "Female Fighters: Perceptions of Femininity in the Super Smash Bros. Community", that despite of Villager's cartoonish appearance, there was comments of the character's nature that includes female Villager standing in a "seductive" pose.

Merchandise
An amiibo of the male Villager was created as part of the Super Smash Bros. series in a limited capacity, being one of 10 amiibo originally released on November 21, 2014. The amiibo is compatible with multiple games, including Super Smash Bros. for Nintendo 3DS and Wii U, Super Smash Bros. Ultimate, Super Mario Maker, and others. It was discontinued alongside the Marth and the Wii Fit Trainer amiibo, with the three had the highest sell-through rate in the United States during their initial release, leading to it becoming a rare collectible following their discontinuation. It was later re-released alongside others to accompany the release of Super Smash Bros. Ultimate.

Further reading

References

Attribution

Animal Crossing characters
Video game characters introduced in 2001
Video game characters of selectable gender
Nintendo protagonists
Silent protagonists
Super Smash Bros. fighters
Child characters in video games
Fictional mayors
Fictional politicians
Video game memes
Fictional melee weapons practitioners
Fictional farmers
Fictional axefighters
Fictional construction workers